Vladimir Aleksandrovich Ovchinnikov is a painter, ethnographer, social activist, and founder of the wall painting of the city of Borovsk.

Biography
Vladimir Ovchinnikov was born in 1938 in Dushanbe. Graduated from Moscow State University of Civil Engineering, he worked on construction sites and was also engaged in scientific work. Candidate of Economic Sciences. Until 1998 he lived in Moscow, and then, after retirement, settled in the city of Borovsk, Kaluga Oblast. He started drawing during his school days, when there was enough free time for it. But only in the last period, after having settled in Borovsk, he was able to devote himself entirely to painting. 
In 2000 he had a solo exhibition at the Art Gallery of Borovsk. There he presented about 100 works - landscapes, portraits, still lifes, made with pastels. 
In the reading room of the Central Library of Obninsk he met Elvira Chastikova (2003), who later would become his wife:
The search in non-traditional areas led Vladimir Ovchinnikov to graffiti and wall painting:

Murals by Vladimir Ovchinnikov

During four summer seasons (2002-2005), Ovchinnikov, a self-taught artist, made about a hundred paintings on the houses of Borovsk, creating on the dull blank walls of city buildings, boarded-up windows, fences, about 90 different subjects (his famous countrymen, churches, historical events, genre scenes: a girl walking on the pipe of a pipeline, an old woman with a bucket near a downspout, a naked boy knocking at the locked door, a man with a giant cucumber in the hands, an old man in his window reading «Times», etc.). Themes are chosen and selected with the help of his wife. Many of the paintings are accompanied by poems written by Elvira.

Ovchinnikov's Star Ship

Ovchinnikov's Star Ship is an art object in Borovsk, representing a 10-meter concrete cylinder with images of outstanding space scientists, writers, astronauts. The artist Vladimir Ovchinnikov turned an abandoned building into a Space Ark.

Gallery repressed

Gallery of 20 portraits from photos of repressed citizens Borovsk district was created in the concrete wall in the center of the city of Borovsk in August 2016. The gallery includes portraits of 20 borovchan shot in 1937–1938. Memorial contains the inscription – "For whom the bell ringing Borovsk ...". Gallery was destroyed by vandals in three days after the opening of the memorial. The event caused a wide resonance in the media.

Vladimir Ovchinnikov is not only famous for his frescoes, which for many years adorn the walls of houses in Borovsk. His main desire - to install a monument in the city of the repressed: 
For fifteen years the artist collected materials for the gallery of the repressed people.
In August, this monument finally appeared: 18 portraits of the repressed, which the artist has painted... on the fence of his neighbor. 
But his another attempt to create a memorial gallery was smashed by the actions of hooligans and vandals. On the wall of one of the shops in the center of Borovsk, a painting of 20 killed people and the image of Alexander Solzhenitsyn was destroyed after only two days. Ovchinnikov's work was destroyed methodically and carefully.

References

Literature 
 Vladimir Ovchinnikov, Vitaly Chernikov. Borovsk in Painting and Poetry: The Exhibition Catalog. —  Moscow: Gallery-Museum Nikor, 2002. —  28 p.: ill. 
 Vladimir Ovchinnikov, Vitaly Chernikov. Borovsk in Painting and Poetry: Art and Poetry Album. —  Kaluga: Golden Alley, 2003. —  192 p.: ill. —   
 Parallel town Vladimir Ovchinnikov and Elvira Chastikova: Art and poetry album. — Obninsk: Printer, 2005. —  48 p .: ill. 
 Dmitry Anokhin. Murals Ovchinnikov engineer. Moscow Construction Decorate Borovsk // Vechernyaya Moskva. — No. 166 (24944). — September 11, 2008.
 Oksana Prilepina. City one Artist // Russkij Mir. — 2010. — No. 2. 
 Anastasia Fyodorova. Why Parallel City Can Sink Into Oblivion // MK Kaluga. — November 16, 2007. 
 Elena Tsygankova. Faces Magazine. Vladimir Ovchinnikov // Faces Magazine 2007, September.

External links

Documentary films and videos
 The documentary film Painted City
 The documentary film City of the Artist
 Borovsk, PREVED!
 A trip to the Borovsk (video) 
 Russian Banksy from Borovsk 
 Parallel City in Borovsk
 Borovsk - Gallery of Kaluga Region
 Banksy from Borovsk

21st-century Russian painters
Russian graffiti artists
1938 births
Living people
People from Dushanbe
Russian economists
Russian contemporary artists
Russian male painters
Soviet painters
21st-century Russian male artists
Russian activists against the 2022 Russian invasion of Ukraine